Jaroslav "Jarda" Krupička (born March 15, 1946) is a Czech former professional ice hockey player.

During the 1972–73 season, Krupicka played 36 games in the World Hockey Association with the Los Angeles Sharks and New York Raiders.

References

External links

1946 births
Living people
Ice hockey people from Brno
Czech ice hockey right wingers
Greensboro Generals (EHL) players
Genève-Servette HC players
HC Kometa Brno players
HC Sierre players
HC Litvínov players
Los Angeles Sharks players
New York Raiders players
SC Bern players
Czechoslovak defectors
Czechoslovak ice hockey right wingers
Czechoslovak expatriate sportspeople in the United States
Czechoslovak expatriate sportspeople in Switzerland
Czechoslovak expatriate ice hockey people
Expatriate ice hockey players in the United States
Expatriate ice hockey players in Switzerland
Czechoslovak emigrants to Switzerland